Dosima fascicularis, the buoy barnacle, is "the most specialised pleustonic goose barnacle" species. It hangs downwards from the water surface, held up by a float of its own construction, and is carried along by ocean currents.

Flotation

As an adult, D. fascicularis lives attached to a float made either of natural flotsam or of a cement it secretes itself, which has a texture like that of expanded polystyrene foam. It is the only barnacle to produce its own gas-filled float. The cyprid larvae are planktonic, and must attach to a float for metamorphosis into the adult form, but the adults are eventually capable of using their own float, sometimes forming aggregations of many individuals attached to a single float. Among the floats used by adult buoy barnacles are pellets of tar, seaweeds, plastic debris, driftwood, feathers, cranberries, cuttlefish bone, the "by-the-wind-sailor" Velella velella, seagrass leaves, Styrofoam, seeds, and even apples; they have even been known to colonise the backs of turtles and the sea snake Pelamis platurus. It is a fugitive species, which can be out-competed by other barnacle species, and relies on being able to colonise surfaces and reproduce quickly; after settling on a float, D. fascicularis can reproduce within 45 days. D. fascicularis appears to be increasing in abundance as a result of anthropogenic marine debris accumulating in the sea; this source of floats was of "minor importance" in 1974.

Related species
Although formerly placed in the genus Lepas, the buoy barnacle is now generally placed in the genus, Dosima. Dosima is distinguished from Lepas by the form of the carina, and by the exceptional thinness and brittleness of its exoskeleton.

Distribution
D. fascicularis has a cosmopolitan distribution, with a preference for temperate seas, having been found at latitudes from 71° North off Siberia to 57° South near Cape Horn. Groups have been observed journeying from Japan to the Hawaiian Islands in the Pacific Ocean, and sometimes wash up on westerly and southerly beaches in the British Isles, as well as westerly beaches further south in Europe. It is not normally found in the Mediterranean Sea, but may have begun to colonise there from the Atlantic Ocean.

References

Barnacles
Taxa named by John Edward Gray